The 23rd Bangladesh National Film Awards, presented by Ministry of Information, Bangladesh to felicitate the best of Bangladeshi Cinema released in the year 1998. The ceremony took place in Dhaka and awards were given by then President of Bangladesh. The National Film Awards are the only film awards given by the government itself. Every year, a national panel appointed by the government selects the winning entry, and the award ceremony is held in Dhaka. 1998 was the 23rd ceremony of National Film Awards.

List of winners

Merit awards

Technical awards

See also
 Meril Prothom Alo Awards
 Ifad Film Club Award
 Babisas Award

References

External links

National Film Awards (Bangladesh) ceremonies
1998 film awards
1999 awards in Bangladesh
1999 in Dhaka